Irwell was a small rural township in Canterbury, New Zealand on the intersection of Leeston and Selwyn Lake Roads. All that remains is the forner school hall, a church, and a small number of houses.

History
In the 1870s it consisted of a two stores, two bake houses, a flour mill, a hotel, and a blacksmiths. In 1879 a small school was established with 32 pupils. By the 1920s it had 50 pupils. The school was closed at the end of 1937 and merged with Leeston School. In 1944 the Ellesmere Guardian reported that the old mills at Irwell were one of the few early buildings still standing in area.

Heritage buildings
Two buildings at Irwell are listed as heritage sites in the Selwyn District Plan. They are the former Irwell school hall from 1879 and St Mary's Anglican Church on Selwyn Lake Road from 1895.

Demographics

The statistical area had a population of 1,278 at the 2018 New Zealand census, an increase of 3 people (0.2%) since the 2013 census, and an increase of 96 people (8.1%) since the 2006 census. There were 513 households. There were 681 males and 597 females, giving a sex ratio of 1.14 males per female. The median age was 44.6 years (compared with 37.4 years nationally), with 222 people (17.4%) aged under 15 years, 186 (14.6%) aged 15 to 29, 672 (52.6%) aged 30 to 64, and 198 (15.5%) aged 65 or older.

Ethnicities were 92.7% European/Pākehā, 9.9% Māori, 1.4% Pacific peoples, 2.6% Asian, and 1.9% other ethnicities (totals add to more than 100% since people could identify with multiple ethnicities).

The proportion of people born overseas was 14.6%, compared with 27.1% nationally.

Although some people objected to giving their religion, 54.9% had no religion, 33.1% were Christian, 0.7% were Hindu, 0.5% were Buddhist and 1.4% had other religions.

Of those at least 15 years old, 183 (17.3%) people had a bachelor or higher degree, and 198 (18.8%) people had no formal qualifications. The median income was $37,300, compared with $31,800 nationally. The employment status of those at least 15 was that 609 (57.7%) people were employed full-time, 168 (15.9%) were part-time, and 12 (1.1%) were unemployed.

References

Populated places in Canterbury, New Zealand
Selwyn District